Abdulrahman Abdullah Ghareeb (born 31 March 1997) is a Saudi Arabian professional footballer who plays as a winger for Pro League club Al-Nassr and the Saudi Arabia national team.

Club career

Al-Ahli
Ghareeb is an academy graduate of Al-Ahli. He was first called up to the first team in December 2017, due to injuries to multiple first-team players. He signed his first professional contract on 17 September 2018.

Al-Nassr
On 20 August 2022, Ghareeb joined Al-Nassr on a four-year contract for a reported fee of SAR22 million.

Career statistics

Club

International
Statistics accurate as of match played 9 June 2022.

Scores and results list Saudi Arabia's goal tally first.

Honours
Individual
 Saudi Professional League Player of the Month: October 2021
 Saudi Professional League Young Player of the Month: February 2021

References

External links
 
 
 
 

1997 births
Living people
Sportspeople from Jeddah
Saudi Arabian footballers
Association football midfielders
Association football wingers
Saudi Professional League players
Al-Ahli Saudi FC players
Al Nassr FC players
Saudi Arabia international footballers
Saudi Arabia youth international footballers
Olympic footballers of Saudi Arabia
Footballers at the 2020 Summer Olympics
2019 AFC Asian Cup players
Footballers at the 2018 Asian Games
Asian Games competitors for Saudi Arabia
20th-century Saudi Arabian people
21st-century Saudi Arabian people